María Rita Barberá Nolla (16 July 1948 – 23 November 2016) was a Spanish politician who was the mayor of Valencia from 1991 until 2015.

Biography and political career
Born in Valencia to a prominent industrial and political family, she was a member of the National Council of the People's Party of Spain and was a Representative in the Valencian regional Parliament (Corts Valencianes). She turned down an offer to become a national deputy at the 2008 Spanish General Election, but her party made her a senator after she lost the 2015 municipal elections. As such, she became answerable only to the Supreme Court, and the ordinary judge in charge of the Taula corruption case could therefore not indict her like the rest of her team.

2016 judicial case and death

On 21 April 2016, this investigating judge therefore requested her indictment for money laundering to the Supreme Court. On 13 September 2016 the Supreme Court opened a formal investigation, usually the step before an indictment, and the People's Party asked her to resign her senate seat. She chose instead to formally leave the party and to become an independent senator, remaining answerable only to the Supreme Court and keeping her senator salary. Until her death, she continued to socialize and vote with the party that she had formally left.

Barberá died in Madrid on 23 November 2016 of a heart attack as a result of hepatic cirrhosis. She was in the process of being investigated for money laundering at the time, and had testified to the Supreme Court only two days prior to her death.

References

External links
 Rita Barberá Nolla
 Rita Barberá Nolla related stories in El Pais newspaper

1948 births
2016 deaths
Mayors of Valencia
People from Valencia
People's Party (Spain) politicians
Members of the Senate of Spain
Women mayors of places in Spain
Deaths from cirrhosis
Members of the 1st Corts Valencianes
Members of the 2nd Corts Valencianes
Members of the 3rd Corts Valencianes
Members of the 4th Corts Valencianes
Members of the 5th Corts Valencianes
Members of the 6th Corts Valencianes
Members of the 7th Corts Valencianes
Members of the 8th Corts Valencianes
Members of the 9th Corts Valencianes